Gates is an unincorporated community in Gates County, North Carolina, United States. Gates has a post office with ZIP code 27937.

The Freeman House and Joseph Freeman Farm are listed on the National Register of Historic Places.

References

Unincorporated communities in Gates County, North Carolina